The 2005 ABN AMRO World Tennis Tournament was a men's tennis tournament played on indoor hard courts. It was the 33rd edition of the event known that year as the ABN AMRO World Tennis Tournament, and was part of the ATP International Series Gold of the 2005 ATP Tour. It took place at the Rotterdam Ahoy indoor sporting arena in Rotterdam, Netherlands, from 14 February through 20 February 2005. First-seeded Roger Federer won the singles title.

The singles draw was led by World No. 1, reigning Wimbledon, US Open and Tennis Masters Cup champion, Australian Open semifinalist, Doha titlist Roger Federer, French Open runner-up, Umag winner Guillermo Coria, and US Open semifinalist Tim Henman. Also present were Australian Open quarterfinalist David Nalbandian, Adelaide and Marseille champion Joachim Johansson, Nikolay Davydenko, Dominik Hrbatý and Feliciano López.

Finals

Singles

 Roger Federer defeated  Ivan Ljubičić 5–7, 7–5, 7–6(7–5)
It was Roger Federer's 2nd title of the year, and his 24th overall.

Doubles

 Jonathan Erlich /  Andy Ram defeated  Cyril Suk /  Pavel Vízner 6–4, 4–6, 6–3

References

External links
Official website
Singles draw
Doubles draw
Qualifying Singles draw

 
ABN AMRO World Tennis Tournament
ABN AMRO World Tennis Tournament
ABN AMRO World Tennis Tournament